The United States federal excise tax on gasoline is 18.4 cents per gallon and 24.4 cents per gallon for diesel fuel. The federal tax was last raised October 1, 1993 and is not indexed to inflation, which increased 93% from 1993 until 2022. On average, state and local taxes and fees add 34.24 cents to gasoline and 35.89 cents to diesel, for a total US volume-weighted average fuel tax of 52.64 cents per gallon for gas and 60.29 cents per gallon for diesel.

State taxes
The first US state to tax fuel was Oregon and was introduced on February 25, 1919. It was a 1¢/gal tax. In the following decade, all of the US states (48 at the time), along with the District of Columbia, introduced a gasoline tax. By 1939, the many states levied an average fuel tax of 3.8¢/gal (1¢/L).

In the years since being created, state fuel taxes have undergone many revisions. While most fuel taxes were initially levied as a fixed number of cents per gallon, nineteen states and District of Columbia have fuel taxes with rates that vary alongside changes in the price of fuel, the inflation rate, vehicle fuel-economy, or other factors.

The table below includes state and local taxes and fees. The American Petroleum Institute uses a weighted average of local taxes by population of each municipality to come up with an average tax for the entire state. Similarly, the national average is weighted by volume of fuel sold in each state. Because many of the states with the highest taxes also have higher populations, more states (i.e., the less populated ones) have below average taxes than above average taxes.

Most states exempt gasoline from general sales taxes. However, several states do collect full or partial sales tax in addition to the excise tax. Sales tax is not reflected in the rates below.

Federal taxes

The first federal gasoline tax in the United States was created on June 6, 1932, with the enactment of the Revenue Act of 1932, which taxed 1¢/gal (0.3¢/L). Since 1993, the US federal gasoline tax has been unchanged (and not adjusted for inflation of nearly 68-77% through 2016, depending on source) at 18.4¢/gal (4.86¢/L). Unlike most other goods in the US, the price advertised (e.g., on pumps and on stations’ signs) includes all taxes, as opposed to inclusion at the point of purchase (i.e., as opposed to prices of goods in, e.g., many stores advertised on shelves without tax which is instead calculated at checkout by many vendors).

Then-Secretary of Transportation Mary Peters stated on August 15, 2007, that about 60% of federal gas taxes are used for highway and bridge construction. The remaining 40% goes to earmarked programs, including a minority for mass transit projects. However, revenues from other taxes are also used in federal transportation programs.

Federal tax revenues

Federal fuel taxes raised $36.4 billion in Fiscal Year 2016, with $26.1 billion raised from gasoline taxes and $10.3 billion raised from taxes on diesel and special motor fuels.  The tax was last raised in 1993 and is not indexed to inflation. Total inflation from 1993 until 2017 was 68 percent or up to 77 percent, depending on source.

Public policy
Some policy advisors believe that an increased tax is needed to fund and sustain the country's transportation infrastructure, including for mass transit.  As infrastructure construction costs have grown and vehicles have become more fuel efficient, the purchasing power of fixed-rate gas taxes has declined (i.e., the unchanged tax rate from 1993 provides less real money than it originally did, when adjusted for inflation).  To offset this loss of purchasing power, The National Surface Transportation Infrastructure Financing Commission issued a detailed report in February 2009 recommending a 10 cent increase in the gasoline tax, a 15 cent increase in the diesel tax, and a reform tying both of these tax rates to inflation.

Critics of gas tax increases argue that much of the gas tax revenue is diverted to other government programs and debt servicing unrelated to transportation infrastructure. However, other researchers have noted that these diversions can occur in both directions and that gas taxes and "user fees" paid by drivers are not high enough to cover the full cost of road-related spending.

Some believe that an increased cost of fuel would also encourage less consumption and reduce America's dependence on foreign oil. Americans sent nearly $430 billion to other countries in 2008 for the cost of imported oil. However and especially since 2008, increased domestic output (e.g., fracking of shale and other energy resource discoveries) and rapidly increasing production efficiencies have significantly reduced such spending, and this falling trend is expected to continue.

Aviation fuel taxes

Aviation gasoline (Avgas): The tax on aviation gasoline is $0.194 per gallon.  When used in a fractional ownership program aircraft, gasoline also is subject to a surtax of $0.141 per gallon.

Kerosene for use in aviation (Jet fuel): Generally, kerosene is taxed at $0.244 per gallon unless a reduced rate applies.
For kerosene removed directly from an on-airport terminal (ramp) directly into the fuel tank of an aircraft for use in non-commercial aviation, the tax rate is $0.219. The rate of $0.219 also applies if kerosene is transported directly into any aircraft from a qualified refueler truck, tanker, or tank wagon that is loaded with the kerosene (again, when done directly on-airport, e.g., on the ramp). Notably, the airport terminal doesn't need to be a passenger carrying, secured airport terminal for this rate to apply. However, the refueling truck, tanker, or tank wagon must meet the requirements discussed later under certain refueler trucks, tankers, and tank wagons, treated as terminals.

These taxes mainly fund airport and Air Traffic Control operations by the Federal Aviation Administration (FAA), of which commercial aviation is the biggest user.

See also
 Carbon taxes in the United States
 Federal Highway Trust Fund (United States)
 Gas tax holiday
 National Association of Convenience Stores

US tax system:
 Excise tax in the United States

References

External links
 History of the gas tax in the United States
 2013 NACS Annual Fuels Report

Taxation in the United States
United States
Aviation taxes
Aviation in the United States
Transportation in the United States